Federal Operator 99 is a 1945 Republic film serial. It was later edited down into a feature version titled F.B.I. 99 for television. The serial is about an FBI agent named Jerry Blake who battles gentleman thief Jim Belmont, who escapes custody with help of his gang and begins a wave of crimes, beginning with plotting to steal the crown jewels of the Princess Cornelia.

Plot
Crime lord James 'Jim' Belmont (George J. Lewis) escapes FBI custody and resumes his criminal empire, only to be thwarted at every turning point by British-accented Jerry Blake, the FBI's Operator 99 (Marten Lamont). Belmont plots to steal the crown jewels of the Princess Cornelia, with the aid of his cohorts Matt Farrell, Rita Parker and his crafty secretary Morton. The criminals succeed in stealing the jewels, then offer to ransom them back, using Jerry Blake (Operator 99) as the go-between. Blake foils their plot and also acts against different criminal engagements by Belmont such as trying to steal a car once owned by Belmont’s partner, a car into which valuable gold has been melted and whose location is known by a former lawyer who worked for Belmont.

Blake's secretary Joyce Kingston gets involved in directly helping Blake thwart Belmont, at one point battling Rita Parker for control of a truck carrying stolen payroll money.  Blake eventually captures Matt Farrell but Belmont and Parker kidnap Joyce and they offer to trade her for Farrell.  Blake is able to trace Belmont to his hidden lair beneath a theatre and winds up battling him high up on a catwalk overlooking a precipitous drop.

Cast
 Marten Lamont as Jerry Blake, Federal Operator 99
 Helen Talbot as Joyce Kingston
 George J. Lewis as Jim Belmont, a sophisticated villain
 Lorna Gray as Rita Parker, Belmont's partner in crime
 Hal Taliaferro as Matt Farrell
 Bill Stevens as Agent Fred Martin
 LeRoy Mason as Morton, henchman
 Maurice Cass as Signor Giuseppe Morello
 Kernan Cripps as Agent Thomas Jeffries 
 Elaine Lange as Countess Delremy
 Jay Novello as Heinrick
 Frank Jaquet as Warren Hunter

Cast Notes

Cline writes that this was a "somewhat uncharacteristic" serial for Republic due to its sophisticated villains, Lewis the frustrated pianist and his "confidant" (Cline's quotes) played by Gray,  and an "obviously cultured, polished hero."

Production
Federal Operator 99 was budgeted at $143,620 although the final negative cost was $153,737 (a $10,117, or 7%, overspend).  It was the cheapest Republic serial of 1945.

It was filmed between 18 January and 14 February 1945.  The serial's production number was 1497.

Stunts
Dale Van Sickel as Jerry Blake (doubling Marten Lamont)
Duke Green as Jim Belmont (doubling George J. Lewis)
Tom Steele as Matt Farrell (doubling Hal Taliaferro)
Fred Graham
Ken Terrell

Special effects
Special effects by the Lydecker brothers.

Release

Theatrical
Federal Operator 99'''s official release date is 7 July 1945, although this is actually the date the sixth chapter was made available to film exchanges.

The serial was re-released on 8 October 1956 between the similar re-releases of King of the Rocket Men and Dangers of the Canadian Mounted.  The last original Republic serial release was King of the Carnival in 1955.

TelevisionFederal Operator 99 was one of twenty-six Republic serials re-released as a film on television in 1966.  The title of the film was changed to FBI-99''.  This version was cut down to 100-minutes in length.

Chapter titles
 The Case of the Crown Jewels (22min 8s)
 The Case of the Stolen Ransom (13min 20s)
 The Case of the Lawful Counterfeit (13min 20s)
 The Case of the Telephone Code (13min 20s)
 The Case of the Missing Expert (13min 20s)
 The Case of the Double Trap (13min 20s)
 The Case of the Golden Car (13min 20s)
 The Case of the Invulnerable Criminal (13min 20s) - a re-cap chapter
 The Case of the Torn Blueprint (13min 20s)
 The Case of the Hidden Witness (13min 20s)
 The Case of the Stradivarius (13min 20s)
 The Case of the Musical Clue (13min 20s)
Source:

See also
 List of film serials by year
 List of film serials by studio

References

External links

1945 films
1940s English-language films
1945 crime films
American black-and-white films
Republic Pictures film serials
Films directed by Spencer Gordon Bennet
American crime films
Films with screenplays by Joseph F. Poland
Films about the Federal Bureau of Investigation
1940s American films